Maurice Armando Torres (born 6 July 1991) is a Puerto Rican volleyball player.

National team career
He is a member of the Puerto Rico men's national volleyball team. Torres represented Puerto Rico at the 2014 World Championship held in Poland.

Sporting achievements
 National championships
 2017/2018  Polish Championship, with ZAKSA Kędzierzyn-Koźle
 2017/2018  Puerto Rican Championship, with Mets de Guaynabo

Individual awards
 2017/2018: Puerto Rican Championship – Most Valuable Player

Puerto Rican national team
Team
 2014 Central American and Caribbean Games: Runner-up
 2017 Men's Pan-American Volleyball Cup: Runner-up
 2018 Central American and Caribbean Games; Champion
Individual
 2014 Men's Pan-American Volleyball Cup: Best Scorer
 2018 Central American and Caribbean Games: Best Opposite
 2018 Central American and Caribbean Games; Best Server

External links
 Player profile at CEV.eu
 Player profile at LegaVolley.it 
 Player profile at Volleybox.net 
 2014 FIVB World Championship – Team Puerto Rico

References

1991 births
Living people
Sportspeople from Ponce, Puerto Rico
Puerto Rican men's volleyball players
Central American and Caribbean Games gold medalists for Puerto Rico
Central American and Caribbean Games silver medalists for Puerto Rico
Competitors at the 2014 Central American and Caribbean Games
Competitors at the 2018 Central American and Caribbean Games
Central American and Caribbean Games medalists in volleyball
ZAKSA Kędzierzyn-Koźle players
Galatasaray S.K. (men's volleyball) players
Pepperdine Waves men's volleyball players
21st-century Puerto Rican people